Tuccia (3rd-century BC ), was an ancient Roman Vestal Virgin. She is known for an incident in which her chastity was questioned by a spurious accusation. In Tuccia's case, she utilized a flat perforated basket to carry water, without the water falling to the ground through the sieve.

Tuccia's proving of her innocence is recounted in the following:
O Vesta, if I have always brought pure hands to your secret services, make it so now that with this sieve I shall be able to draw water from the Tiber and bring it to your temple (Vestal Virgin Tuccia in Valerius Maximus 8.1.5 absol).

Tuccia proved her innocence by carrying a sieve full of water from the Tiber to the Temple of Vesta [Augustine, De Civitate Dei, X, 16, in Worsfold, 69].

The Vestal Tuccia was celebrated in Pliny the Elder's Natural History (28: 12) and Petrarch's Triumph of Chastity in Triumphs. However, in Juvenal's Satire VI (famously renamed 'Against Women') he references her as one of many lascivious women.

Sieve iconography
By the late Middle Ages, the image of Tuccia and her sieve had become associated with the virtue of chastity. Paintings of chaste women would often include a sieve, and this symbol figures prominently in many depictions of England's "Virgin Queen" Elizabeth I in the late sixteenth century.

See also
 Exemplary Women of Antiquity
 Plimpton Sieve Portrait of Queen Elizabeth I
 Vestal Virgin Tuccia (Corradini sculpture)

References 

Vestal Virgins
3rd-century BC Roman women
3rd-century BC clergy
Priestesses of the Roman Republic